Chhindwara Assembly constituency is one of the 230 Vidhan Sabha (Legislative Assembly) constituencies of Madhya Pradesh state in central India. It is part of Chhindwara District.

Kamal Nath, the former Chief Minister of Madhya Pradesh, is the incumbent MLA of this constituency.

Members of Legislative Assembly

Election results

By election 2019

See also
Chhindwara

References

Assembly constituencies of Madhya Pradesh